The Infrared Processing and Analysis Center (IPAC) provides science operations, data management, data archives and community support for astronomy and planetary science missions. IPAC has a historical emphasis on infrared-submillimeter astronomy and exoplanet science. IPAC has supported NASA, NSF and privately funded projects and missions. It is located on the campus of the California Institute of Technology in Pasadena, California.

IPAC was established in 1986 to provide support for the joint European-American orbiting infrared telescope, the Infrared Astronomical Satellite, or IRAS. The IRAS mission performed an unbiased, sensitive all-sky survey at 12, 25, 60 and 100 µm during 1983. After the mission ended, IPAC started the Infrared Science Archive (IRSA) to make the data available to anyone who needed it.

Later, NASA designated IPAC as the U.S. science support center for the European Infrared Space Observatory (ISO), which ceased operations in 1998. About that same time, IPAC was designated as the science center for the Space Infrared Telescope Facility (SIRTF) -- renamed the Spitzer Space Telescope after launch. IPAC also assumed the lead role in various other infrared space missions, including the Wide-field Infrared Explorer (WIRE) and the Midcourse Space Experiment (MSX). IPAC also expanded its support to include ground-based missions with the assumption of science support responsibilities for the Two-Micron All-Sky Survey (2MASS), a near-infrared survey of the entire sky conducted by twin observatories in the Northern and Southern hemispheres.

In 1999, IPAC formed an interferometry science center, originally called the Michelson Science Center (MSC) after interferometry pioneer Albert A. Michelson. MSC was renamed the NASA Exoplanet Science Institute (NExScI) in 2008.

Today, the greater IPAC includes the Spitzer Science Center, the NASA Exoplanet Science Institute and the NASA Herschel Science Center. In 2014, NASA  established the Euclid NASA Science Center at IPAC (ENSCI) in order to support US-based investigations using Euclid data. The combined efforts of these centers support more than a dozen science missions and archives. IPAC is also a participating organization in the Virtual Astronomical Observatory (VAO).

References

External links 
 IPAC official Web site
 NExScI official Web site
 SSC official Web site
 NHSC official Web site
 Infrared Science Archive official Web site
 NASA Exoplanet Archive official Web site
 NASA Extragalactic Database official Web site
 Wide-field Infrared Survey Explorer official Web site 
 Virtual Astronomical Observatory official Web site
 Montage Image Mosaic Software official Web site
 Euclid NASA Science Center at IPAC official Web site
 Aperture Photometry Tool official Web site

California Institute of Technology